The Laura Crane Youth Cancer Trust is a charity based in Huddersfield, West Yorkshire. The charity supports young patients and funds research into cancers affecting those aged between 13 and 24.

History
The charity was registered in 1996 by Jacquie Roeder who set up the charity after her daughter, Laura Crane, died from cancer. The charity’s registration number is 1138003.

Research funded 
 2004 – Long term cancer survival: Models of Follow-up; Evidence and impact of late effects – Weston Park Hospital, Sheffield 
 2006 - The influence of the Epstein Barr Virus on Chemotherapy Response in Hodgkin’s Lymphoma – University of Birmingham 
 2012 - Research into treatment for young people with Ovarian and Testicular cancer 
 2014 – Multi-tumour brain and nervous system cancer which affects teenagers and young adults – Research into a drug-based treatment

Support 
The charity supports young patients and aims to improve their quality of life. One of their main campaigns is to send Christmas gifts to patients spending Christmas Day in hospital. The charity also funds laptop libraries to hospitals nationwide.

Awards and achievements 
 2000 – Received Gold Award in the BBC Look North’s Charity Champions
 2000 –  Jacquie Roeder named person of the year by Huddersfield Daily Examiner and Huddersfield Pride Millennium Community Awards
 2000 –  adopted for three years by Outfit, part of Arcadia Group.
 2003/04 – Jacquie received the Beacon Prize two years in a row for her contribution to charitable and social causes 
 2005 – Jacquie Roeder received a Paul Harris Fellowship from Rotary International
 2006 – Jacquie Roeder was named Local Hero by both Home 107.9 FM and Pulse Radio
 2006 – Received National Lottery funding through Awards for All.
 2006 – Jacquie Roeder is named Tesco’s Mum of the Year 
 2006 – Pass the Parcel Ltd volunteered to deliver Christmas gifts

Celebrity involvement 
Catherine Tate is the current patron.
The charity ambassadors are Keith Senior and Andy Raleigh.
Past patrons have included Zöe Lucker and Jack Dee.

References

1996 establishments in England
Cancer organisations based in the United Kingdom
Huddersfield